A tribal chief or chieftain is the leader of a tribal society or chiefdom.

Tribe

The concept of tribe is a broadly applied concept, based on tribal concepts of societies of western Afroeurasia.

Tribal societies are sometimes categorized as an intermediate stage between the band society of the Paleolithic stage and civilization with centralized, super-regional government based in cities. Anthropologist Elman Service distinguishes two stages of tribal societies: simple societies organized by limited instances of social rank and prestige, and more stratified societies led by chieftains or tribal kings (chiefdoms). Stratified tribal societies led by tribal kings are thought to have flourished from the Neolithic stage into the Iron Age, albeit in competition with urban civilisations and empires beginning in the Bronze Age.

In the case of tribal societies of indigenous peoples existing within larger colonial and post-colonial states, tribal chiefs may represent their tribe or ethnicity in a form of self-government.

Chieftain

The most common types are the chairman of a council (usually of "elders") and/or a broader popular assembly in "parliamentary" cultures, the war chief (may be an alternative or additional post in war time), the hereditary chief, and the politically dominant medicineman.

The term is usually distinct from chiefs at lower levels, such as village chief (geographically defined) or clan chief (an essentially genealogical notion). The descriptive "tribal" requires an ethno-cultural identity (racial, linguistic, religious etc.) as well as some political (representative, legislative, executive and/or judicial) expression. In certain situations, and especially in a colonial context, the most powerful member of either a confederation or a federation of such tribal, clan or village chiefs would be referred to as a paramount chief.

History

Classical sources of information about tribal societies are external descriptions such as from Greco-Roman ethnography, which identified societies, surrounding the societies of the ethnographers, as tribal.

States and colonialism, particularly in the last centuries, forced their central governments onto many remaining tribal societies.

In some instances tribes have retained or regained partial self-government and their lifestyles, with Indigenous peoples rights having been fought for and some being secured on state or international levels.

Terms of specific tribal chiefdoms

Americas
 Lonco (mapudungun: longko, "head") among the Mapuche
 Morubixaba — tribal Cacique (chief) of the Tupi people
 Oubutu (among the Kalinago people of the southern Caribbean)
 Rajiv (among the central Trinidadian people of Freeport)
 Tyee, a tribal chief of the Chinookan peoples in the Pacific Northwest of the present-day United States
Cacique, a term used among the Taino Nation of the Caribbean islands, later adopted by the Spanish to refer to all heads of chiefdoms whom they encountered: Cuauhtémoc, Tecun Uman, Tenamaxtli, Atlácatl, Lempira, Nicarao (cacique), Tupac Amaru II
Sachem, term of chiefdom of the Algonquian nations of present-day New England in the United States
Afro Bolivian king

Africa

 Ishe or She for male chiefs and Shekadzi for a woman (Shona people of Zimbabwe)
 Agwam (Atyap and Bajju people of central Nigeria)
 Eze (Igbo people of Nigeria)
 Gbong Gwom Jos (of the Berom people of Nigeria)
 Ker (Luo people)
 Kgosi (amongst the Tswana people of Botswana and South Africa)
 Lamido (in the Hausaland region of Niger and Nigeria)
 Mogho Naba (in the Ouagadougou region of Burkina Faso)
 Nkosi (Zulu, Ndebele and Xhosa peoples, South Africa and Zimbabwe)
 Oba and Oloye (also in Nigeria, with various Yoruba and Bini holders).
 Obai (Temne people of Sierra Leone)
 Omanhene (amongst the Akan peoples of Ghana)
 Orkoiyot (Nandi people in Kenya)
 Obong (of the Efik people of Calabar in Southern Nigeria)
 Tor Tiv of the Tiv people of Central Nigeria
 Uyini (meaning 'lord') of the Ukelle of Southern Nigeria

Oceania and Southeast Asia
 Aliʻi and Aliʻi nui were the chiefs and high chiefs of the islands of Hawaii Islands
 Ariki, 'ariki henua
 Grade-taking systems of northern Vanuatu
 Ibedul
 Meena means Chief of tribals in South Asia.
 Iroijlaplap
 Maga'låhi and maga'håga, the first-borne male and female, respectively, joint heads of a Chamorro clan, through the maternal line, of the Mariana Islands
 Matai, in the Samoan fa'amatai system
 Nahnmwarki (Pohnpei), Lepen Palikir
Pilung, a title for village, municipal and paramount chiefs and rulers of the Yap Islands
 Rangatira, a chief of Māori in New Zealand
 Ratu, Fijian Chief, Malay for Queen
 Datu, Malay and Filipino Chief

Modern states or regions providing an organized form of tribal chiefships

Arabia
Arabs, in particular peninsular Arabs, nomadic Bedouins and many Iraqis and Syrians, are largely organized in tribes, many of whom have official representatives in governments. Tribal chiefs are known as sheikhs, though this term is also sometimes applied as an honorific title to spiritual leaders of Sufism.

Bolivia
The Afro-Bolivian people, a recognized ethnic constituency of Bolivia, are led by a king whose title is also recognized by the Bolivian government.

Botswana
In Botswana, the reigning kgosis of the various tribes are legally empowered to serve as advisers to the government as members of the Ntlo ya Dikgosi, the national House of Chiefs. In addition to this, they also serve as the ex officio chairs of the tribal kgotlas, meetings of all of the members of the tribes, where political and social matters are discussed.

Canada

The band is the fundamental unit of governance among the First Nations in Canada (formerly called "Indians").  Most bands have elected chiefs, either directly elected by all members of the band, or indirectly by the band council, these chiefs are recognized by the Canadian state under the terms of the Indian Act.  As well, there may be traditional hereditary or charismatic chiefs, who are usually not part of the Indian Act-sanctioned formal government.  There were 614 bands in Canada in 2012.  There is also a national organization, the Assembly of First Nations, which elects a "national chief" to act as spokesperson of all First Nations bands in Canada.

Ghana
The offices and traditional realms of the nanas of Ghana are constitutionally protected by the republican constitution of the country. The chiefs serve as custodians of all traditional lands and the cultures of the traditional areas. They also serve as members of the Ghanaian National House of Chiefs.

Nigeria
Although both the Nigerian traditional rulers and the wider chieftaincy aren't mentioned in Nigeria's current constitution, they derive their powers from various so-called Chiefs laws and are therefore legally recognized. The traditional rulers  and select chiefs usually serve as members of each federating state's State Council of Traditional Rulers and Chiefs.

Oceania
The Solomon Islands have a Local Court Act which empowers chiefs to deal with crimes in their communities, thus assuring them of considerable effective authority.

Philippines
Apo Rodolfo Aguilar (Kudol I) serves as the chieftain of the Tagbanwa tribes people living in Banuang Daan and Cabugao settlements in Coron Island, Palawan, Philippines. His position is recognized by the Filipino government.

South Africa
Such figures as the king of the Zulu Nation and the rain queen are politically recognized in South Africa because they derive their status, not only from tribal custom, but also from the Traditional Leadership Clause of the country's current constitution. Some of them are members of the National House of Traditional Leaders.

Uganda
The pre-colonial states that existed in what is today Uganda were summarily abolished following independence from Great Britain. However, following constitutional reforms in 1993, a number of them were restored as politically neutral constituencies of the state by the government of Yoweri Museveni. Such figures as the kabaka of Buganda and the omukama of Toro typify the Ugandan chieftaincy class.

United States

Historical cultural differences between tribes
Generally, a tribe or nation is considered to be part of an ethnic group, usually sharing cultural values. 
For example, the forest-dwelling Chippewa historically built dwellings from the bark of trees. On the Great Plains, where trees were rare, some tribes typically dwelt in skin-covered tipis, usually acquiring the lodgepoles by trade, while other Plains tribes, such as the Pawnee, built their lodges of earth. The Pueblo people of the Southwest built their dwellings of stone and earth.

Political power in a tribe
A chief might be considered to hold all political power, say by oratory or by example. But on the North American continent, it was historically possible to evade the political power of another by migration. The Mingos, for example, were Iroquois who migrated further west to the sparsely populated Ohio Country during the 18th century. Two Haudenosaunee, or Iroquois, Hiawatha and the Great Peacemaker, formulated a constitution for the Iroquois Confederation.

The tribes were pacified by units of the United States Army in the nineteenth century, and were also subject to forced schooling in the decades afterward. Thus, it is uncommon for today's tribes to have a purely Native American cultural background, and today Native Americans are in many ways simply another ethnicity of the secular American people. Because formal education is now respected, some like Peter MacDonald, a Navajo, left their jobs in the mainstream U.S. economy to become chairpeople of their tribal councils or similar self-government institutions.

Not all tribal leaders are or were men. Wilma Mankiller was a well-known chief of the Cherokee Nation. Also, the chief may not free to wield power without the consent of a council of elders of some kind. For example: Cherokee men were not permitted to go to war without the consent of the council of women.

Tribal government is an official form of government in the United States, as it is in a number of countries around the world.

Historically, the U.S. government treated tribes as seats of political power, and made treaties with the tribes as legal entities. Be that as it may, the territory of these tribes fell under the authority of the Bureau of Indian Affairs as reservations held in trust for the tribes. Citizenship was formerly considered a tribal matter. For example, it was not until 1924 that the Pueblo people were granted U.S. citizenship, and it was not until 1948 that the Puebloans were granted the right to vote in state elections in New Mexico. In Wisconsin, the Menominee has its own county Menominee County, Wisconsin with special car license plates; 87% of the county's population is Native American.

Mainstream Americans often find pride and comfort in realizing that at least part of their ethnic ancestry is Native American, although the connection is usually only sentimental and not economic or cultural. Thus, there is some political power in one's ability to claim a Native American connection (as in the Black Seminole).

Economic power in a tribe

Because the Nations were sovereign, with treaty rights and obligations, the Wisconsin tribes innovated Indian gaming in 1988, that is, on-reservation gambling casinos, which have since become a US$14 billion industry nationwide. This has been imitated in many of the respective states that still have indigenous American tribes. The money that this generates has engendered some political scandal. For example, the Tigua tribe, which fled their ancestral lands in New Mexico during the Pueblo revolt of 1680, and who then settled on land in El Paso County, Texas, has paid for a low probable return to the tribe because of the Jack Abramoff publicity.

Many of the tribes use professional management for their money. Thus, the Mescalero Apache renovated their Inn of the Mountain Gods to include gambling as well as the previous tourism, lodging, and skiing in the older Inn.

The Navajo nation defeated bids to open casinos in 1994, but by 2004 the Shiprock casino was a fait accompli.

See also
Cacique
House of chiefs
Indirect rule
Opperhoofd
Petty kingdom
Roman Reigns
Sachem
Sagamore (title)

Explanatory notes
 The Field Museum in Chicago, Illinois has an exhibit on the Pawnee earth lodge.
 The Field Museum has exhibits with artifacts, dress, tools and pottery of the Pueblo people, the Northwest tribes, the Plains tribes and the Indigenous peoples of the Northeastern Woodlands, especially those of the Midwest.

References

External links
Death of Andamanese Tribal Chief in India
List of Tribal Governments in the United States

 
Government
Heads of state
Politics
Positions of authority
Titles and offices of Native American leaders
Titles of national or ethnic leadership